Heble  is a village in the southern state of Karnataka, India. It is located in the Bhatkal taluk of Uttara Kannada district.

Demographics
 India census, Heble had a population of 9584 with 4682 males and 4902 females.

See also
 Uttara Kannada
 Mangalore
 Districts of Karnataka

References

External links
 

Villages in Uttara Kannada district